George Karras (c. 1929 – March 5, 2017) was an American football player, coach, scout and executive.  He served as the head football coach at Wichita State University from 1965 to 1966, compiling a record of 4–15. Karras gave Bill Parcells his first full-time coaching job while the Wichita State head coach.  He left Wichita in 1966 to be the line coach at the University of Massachusetts Amherst.  He was previously the defensive coach there before coming to Wichita in 1964.  Karras played college football as a guard at Villanova University from 1953 to 1955.  Karras attended high school in Etna, Pennsylvania.  He later worked for the United Scouting Combine and as the chief scout in the Northeastern United States for the Denver Broncos of the National Football League (NFL).  In 1987, he was named the director of pro personnel for the NFL's Los Angeles Raiders.  Karras died on March 5, 2017.

Head coaching record

References

Year of birth missing
1920s births
2017 deaths
American football guards
Denver Broncos scouts
Harvard Crimson football coaches
Los Angeles Raiders executives
UMass Minutemen football coaches
Villanova Wildcats football coaches
Villanova Wildcats football players
Wichita State Shockers football coaches
People from Etna, Pennsylvania
Coaches of American football from Pennsylvania
Players of American football from Pennsylvania